The Economic Relations Division (ERD) is one of the four divisions of the Ministry of Finance, of the Government of the People's Republic of Bangladesh. The other three divisions of the Ministry of Finance are: Finance Division, Bank and Financial Institutions Division, and Internal Resources Division. Mustafa Kamal is the minister and Ms. Sharifa Khan is the secretary of the Economic Relations Division.

List of Former Secretaries

Structure 

 Wing-2: World Bank and Japan
 Wing-3: Administration and Middle East
 Wing-4: United Nations
 Wing-5: Asian Development Bank
 Wing-6: Coordination and Nordic
 Wing-7: Europe
 Wing-8: Asia, JEC and F&F
 Wing-9: Foreign Aid Budget and Accounts (FABA)
 Wing-10: Development Effectiveness

See also 
Bangladesh Development Forum

References 

Ministry of Finance (Bangladesh)
Foreign trade of Bangladesh
1976 establishments in Bangladesh
Government departments of Bangladesh
Government divisions of Bangladesh